"Songs About You" (song), by Kira Isabella
Songs About You (album), by Brett Eldredge, or its title track
"Song About You", by Mike Posner